Aplysiatoxin is a cyanotoxin produced by certain cyanobacteria species. It is used as a defensive secretion to protect these cyanobacteria from predation by fish, being a potent irritant and carcinogen, by acting as a powerful activator of protein kinase C. While this action has a tumour-promoting effect, protein kinase C activation can be medically beneficial for some other applications, and synthetic analogues of aplysiatoxin have been researched for anti-cancer effects.

See also
 Debromoaplysiatoxin

References 

Oxygen heterocycles
Cyanotoxins
Bromoarenes
Lactones
Halogen-containing natural products
Enzyme activators
Phenols